The Rugby League European Championship (formerly known as the European Cup and European Nations Cup) is a rugby league football tournament for European national teams that was first held in 1935.

Originally, the European Cup had three teams, with England, Wales and France each playing each other once. Unlike the Tri-Nations series, there was no final; the team finishing at the top of the group was deemed the winner. From 1949 to 1956, a fourth Other Nationalities team entered the European Cup.

From 2003 to 2009, the tournament featured six teams, including Ireland and Scotland. Between 2014 and 2018, the European Championship was contested with four teams. From 2020, relegation was introduced for the first time.

History

1935–1996: Original competition
The tournament was initially played annually, with the exception of the years of the Second World War. In 1946–47, the tournament was altered, with each team playing each other twice, at home and away. The 1949–50 season saw a return to playing only once, but a new team, "Other Nationalities", was added. This team consisted of players who were not English, Welsh, or French playing in the British and French leagues: Australian, New Zealand, Scottish, Irish players, and others all played for this new side.

The 1955–56 tournament had no Welsh team, though Welsh players featured for Other Nationalities. The tournament was not played again until 1969–70. It was revived in 1975, with the three-team format of England, Wales and France playing each other team only once being made standard. The tournament was cancelled after 1981, but it was revived under the same format for 1995 and 1996.

2003–2018: Modern expansion
The tournament was revamped for 2003, with Scotland, Ireland and Russia all joining. The new structure saw two groups of three, with the winner of each group meeting in a final. This structure was continued for the 2004 tournament.
From 2004 Scotland, Ireland and Wales had to have at least four 'home grown' players from their domestic competitions (in the case of Wales this means Welsh clubs playing in the TotalRLConference) in their squad. Effectively this means that at least one home grown player is guaranteed a start.

The 2005 tournament did not include England as a participant; England will instead play matches against France and New Zealand, giving the European Nations Cup a more level playing field. Georgia won the first ever European Nations qualifying tournament in 2005, beating both Serbia and the Netherlands to win a spot in the tournament.

The 2010 and 2014 tournaments were used to choose the team that compete with Australia, New Zealand and England in the subsequent Four Nations. Starting in 2018, the tournament is being used as a part of the qualification process for the Rugby League World Cup.

2020–present: Promotion and relegation era
The European Federation announced a big shake up of the European Championship in 2020 with promotion and relegation between all four European competitions. The 2020 European Championship was to consist of 6 teams with one team being relegated to European Championship B. In July 2020, the 2020 edition of the tournament was cancelled, with the next being in 2022. The 2022 edition will feature 8 teams with England and the winner of the 2020 European Championship B joining the original 6 teams. This tournament was further postponed until 2023, due to the rescheduling of the 2021 Rugby League World Cup to late-2022.

Team appearances

Results

Championship era (1935–1996)

Nations Cup era (2003–2009)

European Cup era (2010–2018)

Promotion and relegation era (2020–present)

Summary

Overall performances by season
This list shows the performances of all teams from all four divisions of the European Championships during the promotion and relegation era only.
 – Champions
 – Runners-up
 – Promoted
 – No movement
 – Relegated

See also

 Rugby League European Championship B
 Rugby League European Championship C
 Rugby League European Championship D
 Women's Rugby League European Championship
 Wheelchair Rugby League European Championship

Notes

References

External links
Rugby League International Federation

Rugby league international tournaments
European rugby league competitions